The Capt. James Loomis House is a historic house at 881 Windsor Avenue in Windsor, Connecticut.  Built about 1825, it is a good local example of transitional Federal-Greek Revival architecture executed in brick.  The house was listed on the National Register of Historic Places on September 15, 1988.

Description and history
The Captain James Loomis House is located south of the village center of Windsor, on the west side of Windsor Street (Connecticut Route 159), the major north–south route through that part of the town, between Rood Avenue and Woody Brook Road. It is a -story brick structure, laid in Flemish bond throughout.  It is four bays wide and two deep, with a boxed cornice and wide frieze.  The main entrance is off-center on the front facade, with a semi-elliptical transom window above.  The windows are otherwise symmetrically placed, with cut stone sills and lintels.  In the gable end at the attic level is a window exhibiting Gothic tracery.  A single-story ell extends the building to the rear.

The house was built about 1828 for Captain James Loomis, whose family was locally important, with numerous houses in the immediate area. This house exhibits a locally distinctive combination of Federal and Greek Revival features, the latter including the wide frieze and pedimented gable, and the former the elliptical fanlight.

See also
National Register of Historic Places listings in Windsor, Connecticut

References

Houses on the National Register of Historic Places in Connecticut
Federal architecture in Connecticut
Houses completed in 1825
Houses in Windsor, Connecticut
National Register of Historic Places in Hartford County, Connecticut